Henry Dittman is an American actor and television host.

History 
He has performed on TV shows such as Entourage, Brothers & Sisters, Good Luck Charlie, Two and a Half Men, Naruto, Party Down, and Higglytown Heroes, as well as being a contributing writer and regular performer on The Chris Wylde Show Starring Chris Wylde on Comedy Central and a recurring sketch player on The Wanda Sykes Show and The Pete Holmes Show.

As a host, he co-produced and hosted The Smart Show, a travel show, for two seasons.  He has interviewed such stars as Tommy Lasorda, Mena Suvari, Marla Sokoloff, Marley Shelton, and Ahmed Best, among others. Previously he hosted 50 episodes of Before & After'noon Movie on the USA Network.  Before that, he was the first host of My Music Channel, a digital cable music video channel sponsored by AOL for Broadband, and the host of Cartoon Network’s live action pilot Fridays, as well as hosting pilots for Fox Reality Channel & E!, and appearing as a regular panelist on Hollywood's Top Ten for ReelzChannel. Henry hosts the longest running Los Angeles Clippers podcast ClipCast with Chris Wylde.

He is also one of five characters in the Japanese beer campaign for Kirin Beer, which filmed in Japan, Saipan, England & New Zealand.  Other commercial campaigns include Go Daddy as the jerk agent to Danika Patrick, Kayak.com as a moronic traveler who buys rice flour that looks like cocaine, United States Postal Service as an over-caffeinated coffee distributor, and Hyundai Motor Company as a Tony-Robbins-style motivational speaker.

As a voice actor, Dittman is known to anime fans as the voice of Kabuto Yakushi on the hit show Naruto. He also plays Kafk Sunbeam on Zatch Bell! as well as lending his voice to a half-dozen pilots and web series for Fox Broadcasting Company's online entertainment sites.

On stage in 2011, Henry won the Los Angeles Ovation Awards as well as the LA Weekly Theater Award for his work in Watson: The Last Great Tale of the Legendary Sherlock Holmes at Sacred Fools Theatre Company, Los Angeles; in 2010 he appeared in the Taylor Hackford directed Geffen Playhouse production of Louis and Keely: Live at the Sahara as Frank Sinatra.

Personal life

In his spare time, Dittman goes on regular trips up and down the California Coast, surfing. The son of a military father, he has lived from Goose Bay, Canada to the Deep South to Guam, and has visited most of Europe, Southeast Asia, New Zealand and North America.

In 1996, he received his BFA in Acting and Directing from the University of Mississippi in Oxford, Mississippi.

Filmography

Live-action roles 

 Apocalypse Goals - Sid Sr.
 Breaking Up with Shannen Doherty
 Brothers & Sisters – Date #3
 Boppin' at the Glue Factory – Eric Labudde
 Crossing Jordan – Kyle Millhouse 
 Entourage – Medic
 Felicity – Doug 
 Good Luck Charlie – Dr. Karp
 Greek – Sports Analyst
 H8R
 Hang Time – Kevin
 Hollywood's Top Ten 
 Knots (lead opposite Illeana Douglas) 
 Lost Everything – Jay
 Monk – Second Fan 
 Open Gate (lead opposite Tyler Hoechlin) – Jeb
 Party Down – Denni 
 The Beach Party at the Threshold of Hell – Sue Biographer 
 The Lamentable Tragedy of Scott – Scott 
 The Swidge – Andrew
 The Wanda Sykes Show – Business Man
 Two and a Half Men – Man
 Zeke and Luther – Sumner Hathaway
 Zoey 101 – Mr. Toplin

Voiceover roles 

 Cars 2 – Count Spatula
 Boruto: Naruto Next Generations - Kabuto Yakushi
 Digimon Data Squad (2007) – Craniamon
 Final Fantasy XIII-2 – Various voices
 Freedom Fighters (2003) – Various voices
 Higglytown Heroes (2005–2007) – Multiple guest-starring roles, sign language interpreter hero
 Lost: The Final Season - Beginning of the End – Narrator (ABC)
 Lost Survival Guide (2008) – Narrator (ABC)
 Naruto television series and video games – Kabuto Yakushi, Kakkou
 Naruto: Shippuden (2009) – Kabuto Yakushi
 Super Drags (2018) – Robert
 Xenosaga Episode II: Jenseits von Gut und Böse (2004) – Tony
 Xenosaga Episode III: Also sprach Zarathustra (2006) – Tony
 Zatch Bell! (2006) – Kafk Sunbeam
 Tiger & Bunny: The Rising (2014) – Golden Ryan
 Tiger & Bunny Season 2 (2022) – Golden Ryan

Awards and nominations
Ovation Awards
2011: Won the award for Lead Actor in a Musical for the role of James Moriarty in the Sacred Fools Theatre Company production of Watson – The Last Great Tale of the Legendary Sherlock Holmes

References

External links

Henry Dittman's Manager's Website Omnipop Talent
Henry Dittman's Voice Agent's Website TGMD Talent
Henry Dittman's Official Website

Living people
American male voice actors
Choctawhatchee High School alumni
People from Fort Walton Beach, Florida
University of Mississippi people
Year of birth missing (living people)
Television personalities from Florida